Jiang Qiuyan (born 14 March 1983) is a Chinese race walker.

Achievements

References

1983 births
Living people
Chinese female racewalkers
Universiade medalists in athletics (track and field)
Universiade gold medalists for China
Medalists at the 2005 Summer Universiade
Medalists at the 2007 Summer Universiade